Zirrah Rural District is in Sadabad District of Dashtestan County, Bushehr province, Iran. At the census of 2006, its population was 11,666 in 2,484 households; there were 12,282 inhabitants in 3,070 households at the following census of 2011; and in the most recent census of 2016, the population of the rural district was 12,319 in 3,592 households. The largest of its 15 villages was Dorudgah, with 2,820 people.

References 

Rural Districts of Bushehr Province
Populated places in Dashtestan County